Las Estrellas ("The Stars"; previously El Canal de las Estrellas, or "The Channel of the Stars") is one of the cornerstone networks of TelevisaUnivision, with affiliate stations all over Mexico, flagshipped at XEW-TDT in Mexico City. Many of the programs of Las Estrellas are seen in the United States on Univision, UniMás, and Galavisión.

History 

Las Estrellas originated from XEW-TV, which began broadcasting on 21 March 1951. The channel was a sister station to the legendary XEW-AM radio station, owned by Emilio Azcárraga Vidaurreta, which was also the owner of the newly launched channel. It was the second commercial TV channel to be established in Mexico City, after XHTV channel 4, owned by the Novedades newspaper. XEW-TV's first transmission was a live, play-by-play, outside broadcast of a Mexican League match, with XEW radio veteran Pedro Septién on commentary duties. Other than live sports broadcasts, XEW-TV initially broadcast films from the Golden Age of Mexican cinema, as its studios in Chapultepec 18 were still under construction. The studio complex, known as Televicentro, would be inaugurated in January 1952. Soon thereafter, the programming scope would be expanded to include live variety shows and television theatre showcases, in a style similar to XEW radio's similarly formatted shows.

XEW-TV would be a pioneer in Mexican television, and would establish many industry firsts. In 1962, the channel would become the flagship network of the newly merged Telesistema Mexicano, which also brought XHTV and XHGC under Azcárraga's hands, and, after merging with XHTM-TV and Televisión Independiente de México, many of these station's programs would move to XEW-TV. As a result, XEW-TV rapidly grew and became the country's most watched TV network, a position which was undisputed for many years, as Televisa held a monopoly on commercial TV in Mexico, which even went into heavily influencing the political landscape in the country. As a result, by 1985, and in preparation for the 1986 FIFA World Cup (in which Televisa was the host broadcaster), XEW-TV was renamed El Canal de las Estrellas, in reference to the station's line-up of actors, comedians and presenters. This was further reinforced with the launch of an image campaign song, sung by Lucía Méndez, in 1988.

After the death of Emilio Azcárraga Milmo in 1997, El Canal de las Estrellas suffered a massive restructuring of its programming. The biggest moment of the restructuring came in 1998, when 24 Horas, the Jacobo Zabludovsky-anchored newscast, long a propaganda mouthpiece of the Mexican political regime, was canceled. The station's brand identity was also replaced with a new logo created by Pablo Rovalo. After a period of ratings turmoil, viewership stabilized, but the channel had to contend now with a surgent XHDF, freshly privatized and bought under the auspicies of TV Azteca.

After years of decline, particularly after 2012, as accusations of political bias in favor of then-President Enrique Peña Nieto began to hamper the broadcaster's credibility, in 2016, the decision was made to relaunch entirely the station's branding and programming. On 22 August 2016, XEW-TV was renamed as Las Estrellas, and introduced many changes to its programming schedule, including shorter and snappier telenovelas and news programming, as well as dropping many long-running programming in favour of programming oriented to a younger audience. The changes generated a big ratings decline; as a result, by 2017, much of the new programming was canceled and the prime time telenovelas and news programming were relocated to pre-relaunch timeslots and viewership stabilized, specially, during the COVID-19 pandemic.

Las Estrellas Internacional  
Las Estrellas is available as a pay television network in Europe and Australia as Las Estrellas Europa and Las Estrellas Latinoamérica in Central and South America through Televisa Networks. Both feeds differ from the Las Estrellas programming, usually broadcasting shows weeks behind their original broadcast.

In Canada, XEW-TDT and the Las Estrellas schedule is available in full on Rogers Cable (limited to the Greater Toronto Area) and Bell Fibe TV as an eligible foreign service.

Network logos

Programming 
 
Weekday programming in the afternoon and prime time consists of telenovelas. Las Estrellas airs sports programming and sports specials like the Olympic Games and the FIFA World Cup. Morning and afternoon programming consists of news, sports, talk shows, and variety shows. Night time programming is filled with a news program and Univision-produced shows. Examples of shows produced by Las Estrellas are Recuerda y Gana, Hoy, El Juego de las Estrellas, and Cuéntamelo ya. The network also produces and airs the Premios TVyNovelas, sponsored by the Televisa-owned magazine of the same name and considered the highest honor in the domestic Mexican television industry.

Repeaters
The following is a list of all full-time Las Estrellas repeaters:

|-

|-

|-

|-

|-

|-

|-

|-

|-

|-

|-

|-

|-

|-

|-

|-

|-

|-

|-

|-

|-

|-

|-

|-

|-

|-

|-

|-

|-

|-

|-

|-

|-

|-

|-

|-

|-

|-

|-

|-

|-

|-

|-

|-

|-

|-

|-

|-

|-

|-

|-

|-

|-

|-

|-

|-

|-

|-

|-

|-

|-

|-

|-

|-

|-

|-

|-

|-

|-

|-

|-

|-
|-

|-

|-

|-

|-

|-

|-

|-

|-

|-

|-

|-

|-

|-

|-

|-

|-

|-

|-

|-

|-

|-

|-

|-

|-

|-

|-

|-

|-

|-

|-

|-

|-

|-

|-

|-

|-

|-

|-

|-

|-

|-

|-

|-

|-

|-

|-

|-

|-

|-

|-

|-

|-

|-

|-

References

External links  
  

 
Television channels and stations established in 1951
Television networks in Mexico
Televisa broadcast television networks
Mass media in Mexico City
Spanish-language television stations in Mexico
1951 establishments in Mexico